(Arabic: يوسف المغربي) was a 17th-century traveler and lexicographer active in Cairo. "apology of the Egyptian vernacular", literally "the lifting of the burden from the speech of the population of Egypt"), which survives in a unique manuscript kept at St. Petersburg State University.
Al-Maghribi's dictionary reflects a wider trend in  early 17th century Ottoman Egypt towards colloquial writing.

Edition
Abdul-Salam Ahmad Awwad, Moscow (1968).

References

Elisabeth Zack. Yusuf al-Maghribi's Egyptian-Arabic Word List. A Unique Manuscript in the St. Petersburg State University Library, Manuscripta orientalia  2001, vol. 7, no3, pp. 46–49.
Society and Economy in Egypt and the Eastern Mediterranean, 1600–1900, American Univ in Cairo Press (2005), p. 34.
Paula Sanders, Creating Medieval Cairo, American Univ in Cairo Press (2007), p. 99
Nelly Hanna, In Praise of Books: A Cultural History of Cairo's Middle Class, Sixteenth to the Eighteenth Century, Syracuse University Press (2003), chapter 5.

See also
De vulgari eloquentia

Year of birth unknown
16th-century births
1611 deaths
17th-century linguists
17th-century writers
17th-century lexicographers
17th-century travelers
17th-century Moroccan people
17th-century writers from the Ottoman Empire
Arab grammarians
Arabs from the Ottoman Empire
Moroccan emigrants to Egypt